The rufous-winged antwren has been split into two species:

 Rufous-margined antwren, Herpsilochmus rufimarginatus
 Rusty-winged antwren, Herpsilochmus frater

Birds by common name